The Owls club is an historic building in the El Presidio neighborhood of Tucson, Arizona, originally built in 1902 as the second building for the Owls, a bachelor's club in that city. , it was occupied by the Center for Biological Diversity, which acquired the property in 2014, after it had passed through numerous other owners.

Original building
The original building of the Owls had been built in 1894 by "a group of prosperous bachelors who built and lived in an impressive house", and was occupied by those men until it was sold in 1900. The group called themselves the Owls "because the parties would last late into the night". The original building passed through various hands, ending up with the American Legion before being torn down in 1967 to accommodate a widening of the main roads it abutted.

Construction of the second building
It was reported in January 1902 that the Owls would build a new clubhouse. The building was designed by architect Henry C. Trost, of the firm of Trost & Rust, and was constructed at 378 North Main Avenue. Architectural details were reported as construction was being planned:

It was suggested that the new building would be "a model for convenience and comfort and... one of the finest private clubhouses in the West". Ground was broken for the building in April 1902, and the first major event reported to be held at the club was a luncheon for the newly appointed territorial governor Alexander Oswald Brodie, on July 22, 1902. The club soon developed a reputation for elegance that rivaled that of some of the nation's most exclusive clubs.

Occupation and changes of ownership
At the time of its opening, three men occupied the house and co-owned it as shareholders, Leo Goldschmidt, Herbert Tenney, and M.P. Freeman. The organization dissolved in 1912 as bachelor members Tenney and Freeman moved on to have families or pursue other interests. Goldschmidt bought out their shares in 1912, and lived there himself for a time, eventually passing the house along to nieces and nephews. It was still in his possession when he died in 1944. The Owls club building was later sold several times, and after falling into disrepair, the building was restored in 1986. and was sold to Raul Pina and Michael Carlier in May 2005. It was put up for sale in 2009 at an asking price of $2,000,000, placed into foreclosure in January 2011, and ultimately purchased by the Center for Biological Diversity in April 2014.

References

1902 establishments in Arizona Territory
Buildings and structures in Tucson, Arizona
Buildings and structures completed in 1902